Diadem of 12 Stars is the debut studio album of the black metal band Wolves in the Throne Room. It was this recording that caught the attention of Southern Lord Records, who subsequently signed the band in late 2006 and re-released the album on vinyl. It was subsequently re-issued in 2016 through the band's own imprint, Artemisia Records.

The album was co-produced and engineered by Tim Green, who was also a producer for Weakling, a band which Wolves in the Throne Room have cited as one of their main early influences.

Track listing

Personnel
Wolves in the Throne Room
Nathan Weaver - guitar, vocals
Aaron Weaver - drums
Rick Dahlin - guitar, vocals

Additional musicians
Jamie Myers (Hammers of Misfortune) - vocals on track 2
Dino Sommese (Dystopia, Asunder)- vocals on track 1 and 3

Production
Produced by Tim Green and Wolves in the Throne Room

References

2006 debut albums
Wolves in the Throne Room albums
Southern Lord Records albums